Sharda was a monthly Nepali literary magazine from Nepal. It was one of the most popular and renowned literary magazine.

Background 
It was one of the most important Nepali literary magazine. Many Nepali writers have started their careers by publishing their writings in this magazine. The role of Sharada magazine was remarkable in the romantic period of Nepali literature. This magazine used to publish works of all genres of modern literature. Sharada magazine played the first role in introducing modernity in Nepali literature. The writings of many popular writers used to be published in the magazines among them were Laxmi Prasad Devkota, Balakrishna Sama, Lekhnath Poudyal, Siddhicharan Shrestha, Ram Krishna Sharma, Hriday Chandra Singh Pradhan, Bhawani Bhikshu, Pushkar Shamsher, Bishweshwar Prasad Koirala and Shiva Kumar Rai.

Sharada kala (Sharada era) is a popular term for the era during which the Nepali poetry flourished. Siddhicharan Shrestha, Kedar Man Vyathit and Gopal Prasad Rimal wre three of the most popular poets during that era.

History 
It was started by Subba Riddhi Bahadur Malla in March 1934.  It was the first registered newspaper/ magazine in Nepal under the 1994 BS Act. Malla also served as the editor of the magazine. Due to the strict censorship during Rana regime, the magazine faced multiple obstacles. The writings needed to be attested by censorship department of Nepali Language Publication Committee. Several times, the articles, stories and poems needed to be edited in compliance with the government which used to frustrate the writers.

The publication of the magazine was regular from 1934 to1943. For some years after 19, the publication became irregular. The magazine again ran smoothly between 1947 and 1949 but started to decline slowly. It was closed in 1962 due to lack of funding.

Revival and closure 
The magazine was revived under the editorship of Bimal Bhaukaji but closed soon.

See also 

 Dharmodaya
 Gorkhapatra
 Kantipur
 Ruprekha
 Moti Laxmi Upasika

References 

Magazines published in Nepal
Defunct magazines published in Nepal
1934 establishments in Nepal
Literary magazines published in Nepal
Defunct literary magazines